Adore You may refer to:
"Adore You" (Miley Cyrus song) (2013)
"Adore You" (Harry Styles song) (2019)
"Adore You" (Jessie Ware song) (2019)

See also
I Adore You (disambiguation)